In number theory, an n-Knödel number for a given positive integer n is a composite number m with the property that each i < m coprime to m satisfies . The concept is named after Walter Knödel.

The set of all n-Knödel numbers is denoted Kn.
The special case K1 is the Carmichael numbers. There are infinitely many n-Knödel numbers for a given n.  

Due to Euler's theorem every composite number m is an n-Knödel number for  where  is Euler's totient function.

Examples

References

Literature 
 
 

Number theory